Tool is an American progressive rock band from Los Angeles, California. Formed in 1990, the band originally featured vocalist Maynard James Keenan, guitarist Adam Jones, bassist Paul D'Amour and drummer Danny Carey, although D'Amour was replaced by Justin Chancellor in 1995. The group released its first demo 72826 in 1991, which credited all four band members for songwriting. Opiate was issued the following year, which featured re-recorded versions of 72826 tracks "Hush" and "Part of Me", as well as live versions of "Cold and Ugly" and "Jerk-Off". The band released its debut full-length album Undertow in 1993, which once again credited all four band members for songwriting. The album also featured a contribution by former Black Flag and then-Rollins Band frontman Henry Rollins, who performed additional vocals on "Bottom".

After Chancellor replaced D'Amour, Tool released its second album Ænima in 1996. In 2000 the band released the compilation Salival, which featured several previously unreleased studio recordings (including a cover version of the Led Zeppelin song "No Quarter") in addition to a number of live tracks. Tool's third studio album Lateralus followed the next year, which was the band's first release to top the US Billboard 200. Five years later 10,000 Days was released, which also topped the Billboard 200 and several other albums charts around the world. Tool has been on and off hiatus in recent years, although a long-awaited fifth studio album is currently being recorded as of October 2016.
In August 2019, Tool released ‘’Fear Inoculum’’

Songs

See also
Tool discography

Footnotes

References

External links
List of Tool songs at AllMusic

Tool